Orléans (formerly Ottawa—Orléans, Gloucester—Carleton and Carleton—Gloucester) is a federal electoral district in Ottawa, Ontario, Canada, that has been represented in the House of Commons of Canada since 1988.

The riding was created as "Carleton—Gloucester" in 1987. Its name was changed to "Gloucester—Carleton" in 1996, but then changed back to "Carleton–Gloucester" in 1997. It was changed again in 2000 to "Ottawa—Orléans" and to just "Orléans" in 2013.

Despite having an English-speaking majority, Orléans is among the most francophone of the Ontario federal ridings, and a major centre of the Franco-Ontarian community. According to the 2001 Statistics Canada report, 35% of the riding population speaks French as their mother tongue. In recent years, the riding has experienced a major growth of population and increased housing projects.

In the 2004 federal election, the Liberal candidate Marc Godbout won over the Conservative candidate Walter Robinson by over 4% of the votes. Robinson, a former president of the Canadian Taxpayers Federation, was considered a favourite but failed to win support among Francophones. Ottawa—Orléans was also the riding where the NDP had Canada's youngest woman candidate, Crystal LeBlanc, who received 5905 votes in the 2004 federal election.

Geography
It encompasses the suburban community of Orleans in the east end of Ottawa, Ontario (northern and eastern parts of the former city of Gloucester, Ontario plus the northwestern corner of the former city of Cumberland) as well as the neighbourhood of Blackburn Hamlet and the communities of Notre-Dame-des-Champs and Carlsbad Springs.

The riding consists of the part of the City of Ottawa bounded on the north by the Ottawa River, and on the west, south and east by a line drawn due south from the river to the mouth of Green's Creek, south along that creek, southwest along Regional Road 174 to Blair Road, south to Innes Road, west to a transmission line, south to an abandoned Canadian Pacific Railway track, west to Highway 417, southeast to Ramsayville Road, south to Mitch Owens Road, east to Boundary Road, south to Devine Road, east to Frontier Road, north to Carlsbad Lane and its northern production to Tenth Line Road, north to Wall Road, east to Frank Kenny Road, north to Frank Kenny Road, north to the Ottawa River.

Demographics
According to the Canada 2021 Census

Ethnic groups: 65.5% White, 10.5% Black, 5.2% Arab, 5.0% Indigenous, 4.9% South Asian, 2.2% Chinese, 1.4% West Asian, 1.3% Latin American, 1.2% Filipino
Languages: 48.4% English, 28.0% French, 3.6% Arabic, 1.2% Spanish
Religions: 64.3% Christian (43.0% Catholic, 3.4% Anglican, 3.0% United Church, 1.8% Christian Orthodox, 1.5% Pentecostal, 1.0% Baptist, 10.6% Other), 8.4% Muslim, 1.2% Hindu, 24.1% No religion 
Median income: $56,000 (2020) 
Average income: $64,500 (2020)

History
The federal riding was created as "Carleton—Gloucester" in 1987 from parts of Nepean—Carleton and Ottawa—Carleton ridings. It consisted initially of
 the City of Gloucester, excluding these parts:
bounded on the north by the City of Ottawa, and on the east, south and west by a line drawn from the boundary south along Conroy Road, west along Davidson Road and Lester Road, south along Albion Road, west along the road allowance between lots 10 and 11, Concession 3, south  along the Canadian Pacific Railway line, west along Leitrim Road, north along Limebank Road and River Road to the Ottawa city limit;
bounded on the west by the Gloucester city limit, and on the north, east and south by a line drawn east from the limit near Blair Road, south along Blair Road, west along Innes Road, and south along a hydroelectric transmission line situated east of Meadowvale Lane to the western city limit;
 the southeast part of the City of Ottawa lying south of Walkley Road and east of Conroy Road;
the townships of Osgoode and Rideau;
the northwest part of the Township of Cumberland lying north of Innes Road and west of Regional Road 57 and Trim Road.

In 1996, it was renamed "Gloucester—Carleton", and defined to consist of
 the City of Gloucester, excluding
the part bounded on the north by the City of Ottawa, and on the east, south and west by a line drawn from the border south along Conroy Road, west along Davidson Road and Lester Road, south along the Canadian Pacific Railway, west along Leitrim Road, and north along Limebank Road to the City of Ottawa;
 the part bounded on the west by the western city limit, and on the north, east and south by  a line drawn from the city limit near Mowat Road east to Blair Road, south along Blair Road, west along Innes Road, and south along the transmission line situated east of Meadowvale Lane to the western city limit.
 the part bounded on the north by the Quebec border, and on the west by the western city limit, and on the north, east and south by a line drawn from the city limit east along Montreal Road and Highway 17, north along Green's Creek and due north to the Quebec boundary.
 the part of the Township of Cumberland west of Trim Road and north of Innes Road.

The name of the electoral district was changed in 1997 back to "Carleton—Gloucester", and in 2000 to "Ottawa—Orléans".

Following the 2012 redistribution of Canada's ridings, the riding will lose the neighbourhood of Beacon Hill South from Ottawa—Vanier, and will gain the Cardinal Creek area from Glengarry—Prescott—Russell and the rural area surrounding Carlsbad Spring from parts of Glengarry—Prescott—Russell and Nepean—Carleton.

Members of Parliament

Election results

Orléans

Ottawa–Orléans

	

		
Note: Conservative vote is compared to the total of the Canadian Alliance vote and Progressive Conservative vote in 2000 election.

				
Note: Canadian Alliance vote is compared to the Reform vote in 1997 election.

Carleton–Gloucester

See also
 List of Canadian federal electoral districts
 Past Canadian electoral districts

References

Federal riding history from the Library of Parliament:
Carleton—Gloucester (1987-1996)
Carleton—Gloucester (1997-2000)
Gloucester Carleton (1996-1997)
Ottawa—Orléans (2000-2008)
http://enr.elections.ca/ElectoralDistricts_e.aspx?type=3&criteria=Ottawa--Orleans Ottawa—Orléans (2011) from Elections Canada
 Campaign expense data from Elections Canada

Notes

External links
 Politwitter
 Project Democracy
 Pundit's Guide
 StatsCan District Profile

Federal electoral districts of Ottawa
Ontario federal electoral districts
1987 establishments in Ontario